The 2020 Tohoku Rakuten Golden Eagles season was the sixteenth season of the Tohoku Rakuten Golden Eagles franchise. The Eagles played their home games at Rakuten Seimei Park Miyagi in the city of Sendai as members of Nippon Professional Baseball's Pacific League. The team was led by Hajime Miki on his first and only season as team manager. 

Regular season

Standings

Record vs. opponents

Opening Day roster 
Friday, June 19, 2020 at Orix Buffaloes

Game log

|-
|  ||  ||  ||  ||  ||  ||  ||  || 
|-

|-
|  ||  ||  ||  ||  ||  ||  ||  || 
|-

|-
|  ||  ||  ||  ||  ||  ||  ||  || 
|-

|-
| Legend:       = Win       = Loss       = Tie       = PostponementBold = Eagles team member

Roster

Player statistics

Batting 

†Denotes player joined the team mid-season. Stats reflect time with the Eagles only.
‡Denotes player left the team mid-season. Stats reflect time with the Eagles only.
Bold/italics denotes best in the league

Pitching 

†Denotes player joined the team mid-season. Stats reflect time with the Eagles only.
‡Denotes player left the team mid-season. Stats reflect time with the Eagles only.
Bold/italics denotes best in the league

Awards and honors
Monthly MVP Award
 Hideaki Wakui - June/July (pitcher)
 Takayuki Kishi - October/November (pitcher)
 Hideto Asamura - September (batter)

Best Nine Award
 Hideto Asamura - second baseman
 Daichi Suzuki - third baseman

Mitsui Golden Glove Award
 Daichi Suzuki - third baseman

Best Battery Award
 Hideaki Wakui and Hikaru Ohta - June/July

Speed Up Award
 Hiroto Kobukata (batter)

SKY Perfect! Sayonara Award
 Eigoro Mogi - September (September 11)

Farm team

Nippon Professional Baseball draft

References

Tohoku Rakuten Golden Eagles
Tohoku Rakuten Golden Eagles seasons